Sean Cleary (birth unknown) is an Irish former professional rugby league footballer who played in the 1990s. He played at representative level for Ireland, and at club level for Dublin Blues.

International honours
Sean Cleary won caps for Ireland while at Dublin Blues 1996…1998 1-cap + 3-caps (sub).

References

Living people
Dublin Blues Rugby League players
Ireland national rugby league team players
Irish rugby league players
Place of birth missing (living people)
Rugby league players from County Dublin
Year of birth missing (living people)